Kohima Village is an Angami Naga village in Kohima District of the Indian state of Nagaland. It is located in the northeastern part of the present-day Kohima Urban Area. The village is widely considered to be the second biggest village in Asia.

See also 
Kohima, the capital city of Nagaland

References 

Cities and towns in Kohima district